Oleg Genrikhovich Savelyev (Russian: Олег Генрихович Савельев, born 27 October 1965) is a Russian politician.

He served as Minister for Crimean Affairs (31 March 2014 – 15 June 2015) and as Deputy Minister of Economic Development (2008–2014) of the Government of the Russian Federation.

Biography 
Oleg Savelyev was born 27 October 1965 in Leningrad.

In 1988 he graduated from the radiophysics faculty of the Leningrad Polytechnic Institute.  In 1995 he worked as the head of the Centre for Electoral Technologies in the pre-election headquarters of the "Our Home – Russia" Party during the elections to the State Duma.  In 1996, during the presidential election campaign, he served as the head PR strategist in the campaign.  In 1998, he was the manager of Alexander Lebedya's campaign in the elections for Governor of Krasnoyarsk Krai.

From 31 March 2014 until 15 June 2015, he was the Minister for Crimean Affairs.  In June 2014, he was placed on a US sanctions list.

References 

Living people
Politicians from Saint Petersburg
1965 births
Government ministers of Russia
1st class Active State Councillors of the Russian Federation
Our Home – Russia politicians
20th-century Russian politicians
Peter the Great St. Petersburg Polytechnic University alumni
Russian individuals subject to the U.S. Department of the Treasury sanctions
Russian individuals subject to European Union sanctions